Feldkirchen may refer to:

Places

In Austria
Feldkirchen in Kärnten, in Carinthia
Feldkirchen bei Mattighofen 
Feldkirchen an der Donau 
Feldkirchen bei Graz  
Feldkirchen (district), the district that surrounds Feldkirchen in Kärnten

In Germany
Feldkirchen, Upper Bavaria, in the district of Munich, Bavaria
Feldkirchen, Lower Bavaria, in the district of Straubing-Bogen, Bavaria
Feldkirchen-Westerham, municipality in the district of Rosenheim, Bavaria
Feldkirchen (Feldkirchen-Westerham), village in the district of Rosenheim, Bavaria
Feldkirchen, Neuwied, a district of Neuwied, Rhineland-Palatinate

Other
SV Feldkirchen, an Austrian football club

See also 
 Feldkirch (disambiguation)